Water is a chemical substance with the formula H2O.

A detailed description of the physical and chemical properties of water is at properties of water.

Water or waters may also refer to:

Liquids and related concepts

Bodies of water or waterways
 Water (s), the oceans of the Earth
 Water, the name given to certain lakes in the Lake District, like Blea Water. See List of lakes in the Lake District.
 Waters, a Scots term for a type of river

Other tangible liquids
 Water, a type of horse jumping obstacle
 Amniotic fluid, the liquid around a fetus released before birth as the "water breaks"
 Drinking water
 Stormwater

Other uses
 Water (astronomy), an area of the sky
 Water (classical element)
 Water (Wu Xing)

Arts, entertainment and media

Fictional entities
 Water (Lexx), a fictional planet
 The Water (Middle-earth), a fictional river

Film
 Water (1985 film), a British comedy film set in the Caribbean
 Water (2005 film), an Oscar-nominated Canadian drama film set in India and directed by Deepa Mehta
 Water (2006 film), a documentary
 The Water (2009 film), a 2009 short film directed by Kevin Drew

Literature
 Water (novel), by Bapsi Sidhwa

Music

Albums
 Water (soundtrack), the soundtrack to the 2005 film
 Water (Gregory Porter album), 2010
 Water, a 1987 album by Zoogz Rift
 Water, a 1993 album by Conor Oberst
 Water, a 1993 album by Saigon Kick
 Water, a 2003 album by Annabelle Chvostek
 Water, a 2006 album by the Beautiful Girls
 Water (EP), a 2018 EP by Sister Hazel
 Water, a 2008 EP by Salem
 The Water (Colin MacIntyre album), 2008
 The Water (San Cisco album), 2017
 The Waters, a 2014 mixtape album by Mick Jenkins

Songs
 "Water" (Elitsa & Stoyan song), 2007
 "Water" (Brad Paisley song), 2010
 "Water" (Ugly God song), 2016
 "Water" (Kanye West song), 2019
 Water (Lynsey de Paul song), 1973
 Water (Miller & Atkins song), 1966
 "Water", a song by the Who from the single 5:15, 1973
 "Water", a song by Martika from the album Martika, 1988
 "Water", a song by Dinosaur Jr. from the album Green Mind, 1991
 "Water", a song by PJ Harvey from the album Dry, 1992 
 "Water", a song by Eggstone from the album Somersault, 1994
 "Water", a song by Oingo Boingo from the album Farewell, 1996
 "Water", a song by Blonde Redhead from the album Fake Can Be Just as Good, 1997
 "Water", a song by Matt Brouwer from Imagerical, 2001
 "Water", a song by Breaking Benjamin from the album Saturate, 2002
 "Water", a song by Galantis from the album Pharmacy, 2015
 "Water", a song by Ra Ra Riot featuring Rostam from the album Need Your Light, 2016
 "The Water", a song by Feist from the album The Reminder, 2007

Television

Channels and station identification
 Water, a BBC Two ident
 Water Channel, a TV network

Episodes
 "Water" (Battlestar Galactica), an episode of the reimagined Battlestar Galactica television series
 "Water" (Stargate Universe), an episode of the Stargate Universe Television series
 "Water", an episode of the television series Teletubbies

Seasons or series
 Book 1: Water, the first season of the TV series Avatar: The Last Airbender

People
Waters (name)

Places
 Water, Devon, a location in England
 Water, Lancashire, a hamlet in England

See also
 H20 (disambiguation) (H twenty)
 HOH (disambiguation) (Hoh or HOH)
 Outline of water
 Waters (disambiguation)
 Broadwater (disambiguation)